Zorro: A Cinematic Action Adventure is a cinematic platform game developed and published by Capstone Software for IBM PC compatibles. It is based on the Johnston McCulley's Zorro character.

Gameplay 
Zorro is a side-scrolling game featuring cinematic action and live action full-motion video cutscenes. Gameplay is similar to that of 1989's Prince of Persia.

Reception 
Next Generation rated it one star out of five, stating that "Unless you've got a fetish for black leather masks and whips, or you're an accredited psychic, we strongly recommend that you avoid this title like the plague."

Reviews 
Computer Gaming World (May, 1995)
PC Gamer (June, 1995)
Power Unlimited (July, 1995)
PC Games (June, 1995)
PC Player (June, 1995)

References

External links 

1995 video games
Cinematic platform games
DOS games
DOS-only games
Full motion video based games
Side-scrolling platform games
Single-player video games
Video games based on Zorro
Video games developed in the United States
Video games set in California